Bong-6 is an electoral district for the elections to the House of Representatives of Liberia. The constituency covers Salala District and four communities of Yeallequelleh District (i.e. Gborkornemah, Zeansue, Tarsiah and Gbondoi).

Elected representatives

References

Electoral districts in Liberia